Shadman or Shademan may refer to:

 Shadman (name), list of people with the name
 Shadman, Qazvin, a village in Iran
 Shadman, Razavi Khorasan, a village in Iran
 Shadman Town, a neighbourhood in Pakistan
 Shademan, Kermanshah, a village in Iran